Scott McGleish (born 10 February 1974) is an English footballer who plays for Leverstock Green. In a career spanning 29 years across four decades, McGleish has made over 900 league appearances. He is one of five outfield players in English football to have ever passed 1,000 games in competitive matches (league and cup), the others being Tony Ford, Barry Hayles, Jamie Cureton, and Graham Alexander.

Career

Charlton Athletic
McGleish was born in Barnet, Greater London. Beginning his career at non-league Edgware Town in 1993, McGleish was soon scouted by league club Charlton Athletic. As he was only aged 20, McGleish was sent out on loan to Leyton Orient for the first of his four spells at the club. It was here that he began to make a name for himself, despite it only being a short-term loan he made six appearances and scored his first senior goal in league football. He returned to Charlton but was restricted to a few starts. He left for Peterborough United but was restricted to a few substitute appearances. He was sent out on loans to Colchester United and Cambridge United.

1997–2007
He was subsequently sold to previous club Leyton Orient. He finally managed to get a constant place in the team, and in his one-year spell back at Brisbane Road he scored seven goals. After this single season he was sold to Barnet, where he finally stayed for four years and repaid them with a goals-to-game ratio of a goal every 3.6 games. He then returned to Colchester United where he averaged a similar goal-scoring tally. He moved to Northampton Town in 2004 under a Bosman transfer and was their player of the year in his first season. In 2006, he retained the player of the season accolade, Northampton's first player for 31 years to do so. The same season he scored 24 goals as Northampton won promotion. He signed a new two-year contract in June 2006.

Wycombe Wanderers
He joined Wycombe Wanderers on 25 January 2007 for an undisclosed fee from Northampton Town, signing a two-year contract. He spent two years with Wanderers, becoming a cult hero with the Wycombe fans.

McGleish was loaned out to his former club Northampton Town on 28 October 2008, for a month's loan lasting until 25 November, wearing shirt number 27. He scored his first goal in his second spell in a first round FA Cup tie at Elland Road against Leeds United on 7 November. His loan move was extended to January 2009, and he went on to score his first and only league goal of his loan period against Scunthorpe United. McGleish's second spell at Northampton was not as much of a success, he scored only twice in 11 appearances so manager Stuart Gray decided not to sign the striker in the January transfer window and he returned to Wycombe.

East London again
He rejoined former club Leyton Orient on loan until the end of the 2008–09 season for the third time. He scored the first two goals of his loan spell in the 3–2 defeat at home to Peterborough United before returning to Wycombe and subsequently being released on 6 May 2009. He then signed a one-year contract with Leyton Orient on 26 May 2009. He scored 12 goals in 41 league appearances prior to the last game of the 2009–10 season away to Colchester United. His goals included a double against Carlisle United in a 2–2 draw, and the winner away from home against old club Wycombe in October. There was a crucial diving header to give Orient a 1–0 win against Charlton Athletic, and another double in a 2–1 win over Tranmere Rovers. On 1 May he scored a 94th-minute goal to seal Orient's League One status with a 2–0 win over Wycombe with a game to spare. The goal also relegated his old club as they needed a win to take their hopes of survival to the last day.

On 7 December 2010, McGleish scored an extra-time hat-trick in the FA Cup Second Round against Droylsden. His teammate Jonathan Téhoué also scored a hat-trick, ultimately guiding Orient to an 8–2 victory and a place in the Third Round.

On 10 May 2011 McGleish was released by Leyton Orient after his fourth stint with the club, despite being the club's top scorer of the 2010–11 season with 17 league goals. He had performed well as mentioned above, making his presence felt all over the pitch without fouling, and poaching goals by quickly taking advantage of space and opportunities. It was felt by fans that he had matured with age and news of his swift departure at the end of the season was met with surprise; not least as the club stated that it was looking to increase front line options. He revealed that he had not been offered a new contract, and added that he was "gutted and a little bit shocked", although he had suspected that he would be released.

Bristol Rovers
On 29 June 2011 he signed a contract with recently relegated Bristol Rovers. On signing McGleish, their manager Paul Buckle said, "Scott has scored goals wherever he has played. I think he is a fantastic signing for us." He told the Bristol Evening Post: "Scott certainly affects games and I don't think there will be any defence in the country that will be able to take their eyes off him for one minute. If they do, it will be at their peril."

McGleish stated that Buckle was the main reason he signed for Rovers, adding, "Paul could have stayed at Torquay and tried to take them further, but coming here was his ambition and I want to be part of it."

On 6 August 2011, the opening day of the 2011–12 season, McGleish scored Rovers' first goal and set up another on his debut for the club in their 3–2 win at AFC Wimbledon.

McGleish re-joined Barnet on a short-term loan deal on 1 March 2012.

On 17 May 2012, McGleish was released by Bristol Rovers.

In November 2012, McGleish joined Chesham United on a free transfer from Whitehawk.

Enfield Town
McGleish was released from Whitehawk on 1 January 2013, and promptly joined Isthmian League Premier Division side Enfield Town. He made his debut for the club in a 3–2 defeat against Bury Town, in which he scored. He scored nine more goals in his next eight games, including braces against Carshalton Athletic and Metropolitan Police, and a hat-trick against Cray Wanderers.

Wealdstone
In March 2013 McGleish accepted an offer to join rivals Wealdstone to help bolster their push for promotion to the Conference South. He made his debut in a 4–2 win over Margate, scoring the fourth in what was an impressive display for the Stones. He played in the Isthmian League Premier Division play-off semi-final against Concord Rangers, hitting the bar late on while Wealdstone were 1–0 up. They went on to lose the game 2–1 in extra time. McGleish signed on for the 2013–14 season at Wealdstone and was a pivotal part of the team which won the Isthmian League Premier Division title and thus achieve promotion to the Conference South. He finished the season the club's top scorer with 23 goals.

Cheshunt
In 2017, McGleish joined Cheshunt. He made his debut in a 3–1 home defeat to Dorking Wanderers in the FA Cup at the age of 43, making him the oldest player in Cheshunt's history.

Return to Chesham United
Having made only one appearance for Cheshunt, McGleish rejoined Chesham United in September 2017; he made his second début in a 2–0 win over Dunstable Town on 12 September, scoring the second goal. In October 2018, alongside fellow coaches Mark Swales and Dave Sandiford, McGleish departed the club. He returned to Hendon as a player-coach in December 2018, a club he played for as a youth in the early 90s.

Career statistics

Correct after match played 26 November 2022

Outside of football
Until 2013, he served on the management committee of the Professional Footballers' Association.

In 2011, while at Leyton Orient, he made a high-profile appearance in a television advert for the Nintendo DS in the UK.

He is currently coaching at Borehamwood Youth FC

Honours

Club
Northampton Town
 Football League Two Runner-up: 2005–06

Wealdstone
 Isthmian League Winner: 2013–14

References

External links

1974 births
Footballers from Chipping Barnet
Living people
Association football forwards
English footballers
Charlton Athletic F.C. players
Leyton Orient F.C. players
Peterborough United F.C. players
Colchester United F.C. players
Cambridge United F.C. players
Barnet F.C. players
Northampton Town F.C. players
Wycombe Wanderers F.C. players
Bristol Rovers F.C. players
Edgware Town F.C. players
Whitehawk F.C. players
Chesham United F.C. players
Wealdstone F.C. players
Cheshunt F.C. players
English Football League players
National League (English football) players
Isthmian League players
Southern Football League players
Enfield Town F.C. players